Galeottiella is a genus of flowering plants from the orchid family, Orchidaceae. Traditionally it had been included in subtribe Spiranthinae, but following molecular phylogenetic and morphological studies it is now placed in a subtribe on its own, Galeottiellinae.

Galeottiella is native to the mountain ranges of Mexico and adjacent Guatemala. It includes two known species (as of June 2014):

Galeottiella orchioides (Lindl.) R.González ex Rutk., Mytnik & Szlach. - Jalisco
Galeottiella sarcoglossa (A.Rich. & Galeotti) Schltr. - from Durango to Guatemala

References 

Schlechter, F.R.R. (1920) Beihefte zum Botanischen Centralblatt. Zweite Abteilung 37(2, Heft 3): 360–361.
Salazar, G.A., M.W. Chase and M.A. Soto Arenas. 2002. Galeottiellinae, a new subtribe and other nomenclatural changes in Spiranthinae (Orchidaceae, Cranichideae). Lindleyana 17: 172–176.
Salazar, G.A., M.W. Chase, M.A. Soto Arenas and M. Ingrouille. 2003. Phylogenetics of Cranichideae with emphasis on Spiranthinae (Orchidaceae, Orchidoideae): evidence from plastid and nuclear DNA sequences. American Journal of Botany 90: 777–795.
Pridgeon, A.M., Cribb, P.J., Chase, M.C. & Rasmussen, F.N. (2003) Genera Orchidacearum 3: 59 ff. Oxford University Press.
Berg Pana, H. 2005. Handbuch der Orchideen-Namen. Dictionary of Orchid Names. Dizionario dei nomi delle orchidee. Ulmer, Stuttgart

External links 

Cranichideae
Cranichideae genera
Orchids of Guatemala
Orchids of Mexico